Spellbinder is a 1988 American witchcraft-themed thriller film directed by Janet Greek, starring Timothy Daly and Kelly Preston. The screenplay was written by Tracy Tormé. The original music score was written by Basil Poledouris. The film was marketed with the tagline "A nightmare of illusion and betrayal".

Plot
Los Angeles attorney Jeff Mills and his lawyer friend and colleague Derek Clayton rescue a beautiful woman, Miranda Reed, from an abusive boyfriend. The boyfriend makes threats at Jeff, but eventually leaves. As Miranda has no home, Jeff offers to let her stay at his. Jeff becomes romantically involved with Miranda, despite the ominous things that keep happening since he has met her. Grace, Jeff's secretary warns Jeff that Miranda is trouble, but he does not heed her warning. Miranda disappears after her mother Mrs. White confronts Jeff in his office.  Jeff seeks the help of the police and Lieutenant Lee warns him that Miranda is wearing a necklace with the sign of a satanic cult suspected of murders and disappearances in the area.

Miranda eventually reappears and reveals that she belongs to the cult, a coven run by her ex-boyfriend and her mother was responsible for her induction into the cult. Miranda says she wants to leave the cult and explains that the mysterious events Jeff has witnessed are part of the coven's effort to bring Miranda back into the fold, as if they have not done so by the winter solstice, Miranda will be free forever. The coven's solstice ritual features a human sacrifice on a beach where the victim has to come voluntarily.

Jeff vows to help Miranda elude the coven. He hides her with his client Brock while he goes to work, but the coven finds Miranda and kills Brock. In a frenzy, Jeff breaks into Miranda's old house and coerces the current occupants who are members of the cult, to reveal Miranda's whereabouts, which is Towers Beach. Jeff and Derek rush to the beach to save Miranda. Derek leaves to call the police, while Jeff stealthily moves towards the beach, where the cult is having their ceremony. Unfortunately, Jeff is spotted and captured. The coven have Miranda tied up as a sacrifice.  Miranda's ex-boyfriend stabs towards her, as Jeff screams—but unexpectedly—he cuts Miranda loose rather than killing her. Miranda then confuses Jeff by seductively dancing around him, rather than running away or helping him.  Before he could come to his senses, Jeff is forcefully tied up where Miranda used to be. Miranda is then robed and joins the coven in their ritual.

It is now clear that Miranda is only there as bait. Jeff is the real sacrifice, and Derek is the actual leader of the coven with Miranda as his co-conspirator to trap Jeff and make him voluntarily come to the sacrifice. Derek and Miranda mock Jeff and Derek kills Jeff who realizes the full extent of the plot and his betrayal, but is too late. The film ends with Grace's funeral; she had died under mysterious circumstances (presumably killed by the cult in order to avoid exposure). The final scene shows Miranda and Derek replaying the same scenario from the beginning of the film on a new victim, Derek's new legal client.

Cast
Timothy Daly as Jeff Mills
Kelly Preston as Miranda Reed
Rick Rossovich as Derek Clayton
Audra Lindley as Mrs. White
Anthony Crivello as Aldys
Cary-Hiroyuki Tagawa as Lieutenant Lee
Diana Bellamy as Grace Woods
James Watkins as Tim Weatherly
Kyle T. Heffner as Herbie Green
M. C. Gainey as Brock
Stefan Gierasch as Edgar De Witt
Roderick Cook as Ed Kennerle

Release
The film was given a limited release theatrically in the United States by Metro-Goldwyn-Mayer in September 1988.  It grossed $657,446 domestically at the box office.

References

External links

1988 horror films
1988 independent films
1988 thriller films
American supernatural horror films
American independent films
American thriller films
Films set in Los Angeles
Films about witchcraft
Metro-Goldwyn-Mayer films
Films scored by Basil Poledouris
Films directed by Janet Greek
1980s English-language films
1980s American films